Rabbi Avraham Yehoshua Soloveitchik  (born June 29, 1949) is the rosh yeshiva of Yeshivas Brisk, one of the Brisk yeshivas in Jerusalem, Israel.

He is carrying on the tradition of his grandfather, Rabbi Yitzchok Zev Soloveitchik, who was known as the "Brisker Rov".

Notable Students
 Rabbi Nosson Brodsky
 Rabbi Yeruchom Brodsky
 Rabbi Mordechai Dick
 Rabbi Uri Meir Kanarek
 Rabbi Tzvi Kaplan
 Rabbi Meir Kessler
 Rabbi Yosef Lipschutz
 Rabbi Shalom Shechter
 Rabbi Shimon Yehuda Svei
 Rabbi Eli Tikotzky

Family tree

References

Rosh yeshivas
Haredi rabbis in Israel
Anti-Zionist Orthodox rabbis
Soloveitchik rabbinic dynasty
Living people
1949 births